Cymbeline , also known as The Tragedie of Cymbeline or Cymbeline, King of Britain, is a play by William Shakespeare set in Ancient Britain and based on legends that formed part of the Matter of Britain concerning the early Celtic British King Cunobeline. Although it is listed as a tragedy in the First Folio, modern critics often classify Cymbeline as a romance or even a comedy. Like Othello and The Winter's Tale, it deals with the themes of innocence and jealousy. While the precise date of composition remains unknown, the play was certainly produced as early as 1611.

Characters 
In Britain
 Cymbeline – Modelled on the historical King of Britain, Cunobeline, and father to Imogen
 Queen – Cymbeline's second wife and mother to Cloten
 Imogen/Innogen – Cymbeline's daughter by a former queen, later disguised as the page Fidele
 Posthumus Leonatus – Innogen's husband, adopted as an orphan and raised in Cymbeline's family
 Cloten – Queen's son by a former husband and step-brother to Imogen
 Belarius – banished lord living under the name Morgan, who abducted King Cymbeline's infant sons in retaliation for his banishment
 Guiderius – Cymbeline's son, kidnapped in childhood by Belarius and raised as his son Polydore
 Arvirargus – Cymbeline's son, kidnapped in childhood by Belarius and raised as his son Cadwal
 Pisanio – Posthumus's servant, loyal to both Posthumus and Imogen
 Cornelius – court physician
 Helen – lady attending Imogen
 Two Lords attending Cloten
 Two Gentlemen
 Two Captains
 Two Jailers

In Rome
 Philario – Posthumus's host in Rome
 Iachimo/Giacomo – a Roman lord and friend of Philario
 French Gentleman
 Dutch Gentleman
 Spanish Gentleman
 Caius Lucius – Roman ambassador and later general
 Two Roman senators
 Roman tribunes
 Roman captain
 Philharmonus – soothsayer

Apparitions
 Jupiter – King of the gods in Roman mythology
 Sicilius Leonatus – Posthumus's father
 Posthumus's mother
 Posthumus's two brothers

Summary
 Cymbeline, the Roman Empire's vassal king of Britain, once had two sons, Guiderius and Arvirargus, but they were stolen 20 years earlier as infants by an exiled traitor named Belarius. Cymbeline discovers that his only child left, his daughter Imogen (or Innogen), has secretly married her lover Posthumus Leonatus, a member of Cymbeline's court. The lovers have exchanged jewellery as tokens: Imogen with a bracelet, and Posthumus with a ring. Cymbeline dismisses the marriage and banishes Posthumus since Imogen — as Cymbeline's only child — must produce a fully royal-blooded heir to succeed to the British throne. In the meantime, Cymbeline's Queen is conspiring to have Cloten (her cloddish and arrogant son by an earlier marriage) married to Imogen to secure her bloodline. The Queen is also plotting to murder both Imogen and Cymbeline, procuring what she believes to be deadly poison from the court doctor. The doctor, Cornelius, is suspicious and switches the poison for a harmless sleeping potion. The Queen passes the "poison" along to Pisanio, Posthumus and Imogen's loving servant — the latter is led to believe it is a medicinal drug. No longer able to be with her banished Posthumus, Imogen secludes herself in her chambers, away from Cloten's aggressive advances.

Posthumus must now live in Italy, where he meets Iachimo (or Giacomo), who challenges the prideful Posthumus to a bet that he, Iachimo, can seduce Imogen, whom Posthumus has praised for her chastity, and then bring Posthumus proof of Imogen's adultery. If Iachimo wins, he will get Posthumus's token ring. If Posthumus wins, not only must Iachimo pay him but also fight Posthumus in a duel with swords. Iachimo heads to Britain where he aggressively attempts to seduce the faithful Imogen, who sends him packing. Iachimo then hides in a chest in Imogen's bedchamber and, when the princess falls asleep, emerges to steal Posthumus's bracelet from her. He also takes note of the room, as well as the mole on Imogen's partly naked body, to be able to present false evidence to Posthumus that he has seduced his bride. Returning to Italy, Iachimo convinces Posthumus that he has successfully seduced Imogen. In his wrath, Posthumus sends two letters to Britain: one to Imogen, telling her to meet him at Milford Haven, on the Welsh coast; the other to the servant Pisanio, ordering him to murder Imogen at the Haven. However, Pisanio refuses to kill Imogen and reveals to her Posthumus's plot. He has Imogen disguise herself as a boy and continue to Milford Haven to seek employment. He also gives her the Queen's "poison", believing it will alleviate her psychological distress. In the guise of a boy, Imogen adopts the name "Fidele", meaning "faithful".

 Back at Cymbeline's court, Cymbeline refuses to pay his British tribute to the Roman ambassador Caius Lucius, and Lucius warns Cymbeline of the Roman Emperor's forthcoming wrath, which will amount to an invasion of Britain by Roman troops. Meanwhile, Cloten learns of the "meeting" between Imogen and Posthumus at Milford Haven. Dressing himself enviously in Posthumus's clothes, he decides to go to Wales to kill Posthumus, and then rape, abduct, and marry Imogen. Imogen has now been travelling as Fidele through the Welsh mountains, her health in decline as she comes to a cave: the home of Belarius, along with his "sons" Polydore and Cadwal, whom he raised into great hunters. These two young men are in fact the British princes Guiderius and Arviragus, who themselves do not realise their own origin. The men discover Fidele, and, instantly captivated by a strange affinity for "him", become fast friends. Outside the cave, Guiderius is met by Cloten, who throws insults, leading to a sword fight during which Guiderius beheads Cloten. Meanwhile, Imogen's fragile state worsens and she takes the "poison" as a hopeful medicine; when the men re-enter, they find her "dead." They mourn and, after placing Cloten's body beside hers, briefly depart to prepare for the double burial. Imogen awakes to find the headless body, and believes it to be Posthumus because the body is wearing Posthumus's clothes. Lucius' Roman soldiers have just arrived in Britain and, as the army moves through Wales, Lucius discovers the devastated Fidele, who pretends to be a loyal servant grieving for his killed master; Lucius, moved by this faithfulness, enlists Fidele as a pageboy.

The treacherous Queen is now wasting away due to the disappearance of her son Cloten. Meanwhile, despairing of his life, the guilt-ridden Posthumus enlists in the Roman forces as they begin their invasion of Britain. Belarius, Guiderius, Arviragus, and Posthumus all help rescue Cymbeline from the Roman onslaught; the king does not yet recognise these four, yet takes notice of them as they go on to fight bravely and even capture the Roman commanders, Lucius and Iachimo, thus winning the day. Posthumus, allowing himself to be captured, as well as Fidele, are imprisoned alongside the true Romans, all of whom await execution. In jail, Posthumus sleeps, while the ghosts of his dead family appear to complain to Jupiter of his grim fate. Jupiter himself then appears in thunder and glory to assure the others that destiny will grant happiness to Posthumus and Britain.

Cornelius arrives in the court to announce that the Queen has died suddenly, and that on her deathbed she unrepentantly confessed to villainous schemes against her husband and his throne. Both troubled and relieved at this news, Cymbeline prepares to execute his new prisoners, but pauses when he sees Fidele, whom he finds both beautiful and somehow familiar. Fidele has noticed Posthumus's ring on Iachimo's finger and abruptly demands to know from where the jewel came. A remorseful Iachimo tells of his bet, and how he could not seduce Imogen, yet tricked Posthumus into thinking he had. Posthumus then comes forward to confirm Iachimo's story, revealing his identity and acknowledging his wrongfulness in desiring Imogen killed. Ecstatic, Imogen throws herself at Posthumus, who still takes her for a boy and knocks her down. Pisanio then rushes forward to explain that Fidele is Imogen in disguise; Imogen still suspects that Pisanio conspired with the Queen to give her the poison. Pisanio sincerely claims innocence, and Cornelius reveals how the poison was a non-fatal potion all along. Insisting that his betrayal years ago was a set-up, Belarius makes his own happy confession, revealing Guiderius and Arviragus as Cymbeline's own two long-lost sons. With her brothers restored to their place in the line of inheritance, Imogen is now free to marry Posthumus. An elated Cymbeline pardons Belarius and the Roman prisoners, including Lucius and Iachimo. Lucius calls forth his soothsayer to decipher a prophecy of recent events, which ensures happiness for all. Blaming his manipulative Queen for his refusal to pay earlier, Cymbeline now agrees to pay the tribute to the Roman Emperor as a gesture of peace between Britain and Rome, and he invites everyone to a great feast.

Sources 
Cymbeline is grounded in the story of the historical British king Cunobeline, which was originally recorded in Geoffrey of Monmouth's Historia Regum Britanniae, but which Shakespeare likely found in the 1587 edition of Raphael Holinshed's Chronicles. Shakespeare based the setting of the play and the character Cymbeline on what he found in Holinshed's chronicles, but the plot and subplots of the play are derived from other sources. The subplot of Posthumus and Iachimo's wager derives from story II.9 of Giovanni Boccaccio's The Decameron and the anonymously authored Frederyke of Jennen. These share similar characters and wager terms, and both feature Iachimo's equivalent hiding in a chest in order to gather proof in Imogen's room. Iachimo's description of Imogen's room as proof of her infidelity derives from The Decameron, and Pisanio's reluctance to kill Imogen and his use of her bloody clothes to convince Posthumus of her death derive from Frederyke of Jennen. In both sources, the equivalent to Posthumus's bracelet is stolen jewellery that the wife later recognises while cross-dressed. Shakespeare also drew inspiration for Cymbeline from a play called The Rare Triumphs of Love and Fortune, first performed in 1582. There are many parallels between the characters of the two plays, including a king's daughter who falls for a man of unknown birth who grew up in the king's court. The subplot of Belarius and the lost princes was inspired by the story of Bomelio, an exiled nobleman in The Rare Triumphs who is later revealed to be the protagonist's father.

Date and text 
The first recorded production of Cymbeline, as noted by Simon Forman, was in April 1611. It was first published in the First Folio in 1623. When Cymbeline was actually written cannot be precisely dated.

The Yale edition suggests a collaborator had a hand in the authorship, and some scenes (e.g., Act III scene 7 and Act V scene 2) may strike the reader as particularly un-Shakespearean when compared with others. The play shares notable similarities in language, situation, and plot with Beaumont and Fletcher's tragicomedy Philaster, or Love Lies a-Bleeding. Both plays concern themselves with a princess who, after disobeying her father in order to marry a lowly lover, is wrongly accused of infidelity and thus ordered to be murdered, before escaping and having her faithfulness proven. Furthermore, both were written for the same theatre company and audience. Some scholars believe this supports a dating of approximately 1609, though it is not clear which play preceded the other.The editors of the Oxford and Norton Shakespeare believe the name of Imogen is a misprint for Innogen—they draw several comparisons between Cymbeline and Much Ado About Nothing, in early editions of which a ghost character named Innogen was supposed to be Leonato's wife (Posthumus being also known as "Leonatus", the Latin form of the Italian name in the other play). Stanley Wells and Michael Dobson point out that Holinshed's Chronicles, which Shakespeare used as a source, mention an Innogen and that Forman's eyewitness account of the April 1611 performance refers to "Innogen" throughout. In spite of these arguments, most editions of the play have continued to use the name Imogen. 

Milford Haven is not known to have been used during the period (early 1st century AD) in which Cymbeline is set, and it is not known why Shakespeare used it in the play. Marisa R. Cull notes its possible symbolism as the landing site of Henry Tudor, when he invaded England via Milford on 7 August 1485 on his way to deposing Richard III and establishing the Tudor dynasty. It may also reflect English anxiety about the loyalty of the Welsh and the possibility of future invasions at Milford.

Criticism and interpretation 
Cymbeline was one of Shakespeare's more popular plays during the eighteenth century, though critics including Samuel Johnson took issue with its complex plot:

William Hazlitt and John Keats, however, numbered it among their favourite plays.

By the early twentieth century, the play had lost favour. Lytton Strachey found it "difficult to resist the conclusion that [Shakespeare] was getting bored himself. Bored with people, bored with real life, bored with drama, bored, in fact, with everything except poetry and poetical dreams." Harley Granville-Barker had similar views, saying that the play shows that Shakespeare was becoming a "wearied artist".

Some have argued that the play parodies its own content. Harold Bloom says "Cymbeline, in my judgment, is partly a Shakespearean self-parody; many of his prior plays and characters are mocked by it."

British identity 
Similarities between Cymbeline and historical accounts of the Roman Emperor Augustus have prompted critics to interpret the play as Shakespeare voicing support for the political motions of James I, who considered himself the "British Augustus." His political manoeuvres to unite Scotland with England and Wales as an empire mirror Augustus' Pax Romana. The play reinforces the Jacobean idea that Britain is the successor to the civilised virtue of ancient Rome, portraying the parochialism and isolationism of Cloten and the Queen as villainous. Other critics have resisted the idea that Cymbeline endorses James I's ideas about national identity, pointing to several characters' conflicted constructions of their geographic identities. For example, although Guiderius and Arviragus are the sons of Cymbeline, a British king raised in Rome, they grew up in a Welsh cave. The brothers lament their isolation from society, a quality associated with barbarousness, but Belarius, their adoptive father, retorts that this has spared them from corrupting influences of the supposedly civilised British court.

Iachimo's invasion of Imogen's bedchamber reflects concern that Britain was being maligned by Italian influence. As noted by Peter A. Parolin, Cymbeline’s scenes ostensibly set in ancient Rome are in fact anachronistic portrayals of sixteenth-century Italy, which was characterised by contemporary British authors as a place where vice, debauchery, and treachery had supplanted the virtue of ancient Rome. Though Cymbeline concludes with a peace forged between Britain and Rome, Iachimo's corruption of Posthumus and metaphorical rape of Imogen demonstrate fears that Britain's political union with other cultures might expose Britons to harmful foreign influences.

Gender and sexuality 
Scholars have emphasised that the play attributes great political significance to Imogen's virginity and chastity. There is some debate as to whether Imogen and Posthumus's marriage is legitimate. Imogen has historically been played and received as an ideal, chaste woman maintaining qualities applauded in a patriarchal structure; however, critics argue that Imogen's actions contradict these social definitions through her defiance of her father and her cross-dressing. Yet critics including Tracey Miller-Tomlinson have emphasised the ways in which the play upholds patriarchal ideology, including in the final scene, with its panoply of male victors. Whilst Imogen and Posthumus's marriage at first upholds heterosexual norms, their separation and final reunion leave open non-heterosexual possibilities, initially exposed by Imogen's cross-dressing as Fidele. Miller-Tomlinson points out the falseness of their social significance as a "perfect example" of a public "heterosexual marriage", considering that their private relations turn out to be "homosocial, homoerotic, and hermaphroditic."

Queer theory has gained traction in scholarship on Cymbeline, building upon the work of Eve Kosofsky Sedgwick and Judith Butler. Scholarship on this topic has emphasised the play's Ovidian allusions and exploration of non-normative gender/sexuality – achieved through separation from traditional society into what Valerie Traub terms "green worlds." Amongst the most obvious and frequently cited examples of this non-normative dimension of the play is the prominence of homoeroticism, as seen in Guiderius and Arviragus's semi-sexual fascination with the disguised Imogen/Fidele. In addition to homoerotic and homosocial elements, the subjects of hermaphroditism and paternity/maternity also feature prominently in queer interpretations of Cymbeline. Janet Adelman set the tone for the intersection of paternity and hermaphroditism in arguing that Cymbeline's lines, "oh, what am I, / A mother to the birth of three? Ne’er mother / Rejoiced deliverance more", amount a "parthenogenesis fantasy". According to Adelman and Tracey Miller-Tomlinson, in taking sole credit for the creation of his children Cymbeline acts a hermaphrodite who transforms a maternal function into a patriarchal strategy by regaining control of his male heirs and daughter, Imogen. Imogen's own experience with gender fluidity and cross-dressing has largely been interpreted through a patriarchal lens. Unlike other Shakespearean agents of onstage gender fluidity – Portia, Rosalind, Viola and Julia – Imogen is not afforded empowerment upon her transformation into Fidele. Instead, Imogen's power is inherited from her father and based upon the prospect of reproduction.

Performance history 
After the 1611 performance mentioned by Simon Forman, there is no record of production until 1634, when the play was revived at court for Charles I and Henrietta Maria. The Caroline production was noted as being "well likte by the kinge." In 1728 John Rich staged the play with his company at Lincoln's Inn Fields, with emphasis placed on the spectacle of the production rather than the text of the play. Theophilus Cibber revived Shakespeare's text in 1744 with a performance at the Haymarket. There is evidence that Cibber put on another performance in 1746, and another in 1758.

In 1761, David Garrick edited a new version of the text. It is recognized as being close to the original Shakespeare, although there are several differences. Changes included the shortening of Imogen's burial scene and the entire fifth act, including the removal of Posthumus's dream. Garrick's text was first performed in November of that year, starring Garrick himself as Posthumus. Several scholars have indicated that Garrick's Posthumus was much liked. Valerie Wayne notes that Garrick's changes made the play more nationalistic, representing a trend in perception of Cymbeline during that period. Garrick's version of Cymbeline would prove popular; it was staged a number of times over the next few decades.

In the late eighteenth century, Cymbeline was performed in Jamaica.

The play entered the Romantic era with John Philip Kemble's company in 1801. Kemble's productions made use of lavish spectacle and scenery; one critic noted that during the bedroom scene, the bed was so large that Iachimo all but needed a ladder to view Imogen in her sleep. Kemble added a dance to Cloten's comic wooing of Imogen. In 1827, his brother Charles mounted an antiquarian production at Covent Garden; it featured costumes designed after the descriptions of the ancient British by such writers as Julius Caesar and Diodorus Siculus.

William Charles Macready mounted the play several times between 1837 and 1842. At the Theatre Royal, Marylebone, an epicene production was staged with Mary Warner, Fanny Vining, Anna Cora Mowatt, and Edward Loomis Davenport.

In 1859, Cymbeline was first performed in Sri Lanka. In the late nineteenth century, the play was produced several times in India.

In 1864, as part of the celebrations of Shakespeare's birth, Samuel Phelps performed the title role at Theatre Royal, Drury Lane. Helena Faucit returned to the stage for this performance.

The play was also one of Ellen Terry's last performances with Henry Irving at the Lyceum in 1896. Terry's performance was widely praised, though Irving was judged an indifferent Iachimo. Like Garrick, Irving removed the dream of Posthumus; he also curtailed Iachimo's remorse and attempted to render Cloten's character consistent. A review in the Athenaeum compared this trimmed version to pastoral comedies such as As You Like It. The set design, overseen by Lawrence Alma-Tadema, was lavish and advertised as historically accurate, though the reviewer for the time complained of such anachronisms as gold crowns and printed books as props.

Similarly lavish but less successful was Margaret Mather's production in New York in 1897. The sets and publicity cost $40,000, but Mather was judged too emotional and undisciplined to succeed in a fairly cerebral role.

Barry Jackson staged a modern dress production for the Birmingham Rep in 1923, two years before his influential modern dress Hamlet. Walter Nugent Monck brought his Maddermarket Theatre production to Stratford in 1946, inaugurating the post-war tradition of the play.

London saw two productions in the 1956 season. Michael Benthall directed the less successful production, at The Old Vic. The set design by Audrey Cruddas was notably minimal, with only a few essential props. She relied instead on a variety of lighting effects to reinforce mood; actors seemed to come out of darkness and return to darkness. Barbara Jefford was criticised as too cold and formal for Imogen; Leon Gluckman played Posthumus, Derek Godfrey Iachimo, and Derek Francis Cymbeline. Following Victorian practice, Benthall drastically shortened the last act.

By contrast, Peter Hall's production at the Shakespeare Memorial presented nearly the entire play, including the long-neglected dream scene (although a golden eagle designed for Jupiter turned out too heavy for the stage machinery and was not used). Hall presented the play as a distant fairy tale, with stylised performances. The production received favourable reviews, both for Hall's conception and, especially, for Peggy Ashcroft's Imogen. Richard Johnson played Posthumus, and Robert Harris Cymbeline. Iachimo was played by Geoffrey Keen, whose father Malcolm had played Iachimo with Ashcroft at the Old Vic in 1932.

Hall's approach attempted to unify the play's diversity by means of a fairy-tale topos. The next major Royal Shakespeare Company production, in 1962, went in the opposite direction. Working on a set draped with heavy white sheets, director William Gaskill employed Brechtian alienation effects, to mixed critical reviews. The acting, however, was widely praised. Vanessa Redgrave as Imogen was often compared favourably to Ashcroft; Eric Porter was a success as Iachimo, as was Clive Swift as Cloten. Patrick Allen was Posthumus, and Tom Fleming played the title role.

A decade later, John Barton's 1974 production for the RSC (with assistance from Clifford Williams) featured Sebastian Shaw in the title role, Tim Pigott-Smith as Posthumus, Ian Richardson as Iachimo, and Susan Fleetwood as Imogen. Charles Keating was Cloten. As with contemporary productions of Pericles, this one used a narrator (Cornelius) to signal changes in mood and treatment to the audience. Robert Speaight disliked the set design, which he called too minimal, but he approved the acting.

In 1980, David Jones revived the play for the RSC; the production was in general a disappointment, although Judi Dench as Imogen received reviews that rivalled Ashcroft's. Ben Kingsley played Iachimo; Roger Rees was Posthumus. In 1987, Bill Alexander directed the play in The Other Place (later transferring to the Pit in London's Barbican Centre) with Harriet Walter playing Imogen, David Bradley as Cymbeline and Nicholas Farrell as Posthumus.

At the Stratford Festival, the play was directed in 1970 by Jean Gascon and in 1987 by Robin Phillips. The latter production, which was marked by much-approved scenic complexity, featured Colm Feore as Iachimo, and Martha Burns as Imogen. The play was again at Stratford in 2004, directed by David Latham. A large medieval tapestry unified the fairly simple stage design and underscored Latham's fairy-tale inspired direction.

In 1994, Ajay Chowdhury directed an Anglo-Indian production of Cymbeline at the Rented Space Theatre Company. Set in India under British rule, the play features Iachimo, played by Rohan Kenworthy, as a British soldier and Imogen, played by Uzma Hameed, as an Indian princess.

At the new Globe Theatre in 2001, a cast of six (including Abigail Thaw, Mark Rylance, and Richard Hope) used extensive doubling for the play. The cast wore identical costumes even when in disguise, allowing for particular comic effects related to doubling (as when Cloten attempts to disguise himself as Posthumus.)

There have been some well-received theatrical productions including the Public Theater's 1998 production in New York City, directed by Andrei Șerban. Cymbeline was also performed at the Cambridge Arts Theatre in October 2007 in a production directed by Sir Trevor Nunn, and in November 2007 at the Chicago Shakespeare Theatre. The play was included in the 2013 repertory season of the Oregon Shakespeare Festival.

In 2004 and 2014, the Hudson Shakespeare Company of New Jersey produced two distinct versions of the play. The 2004 production, directed by Jon Ciccarelli, embraced the fairy tale aspect of the story and produced a colourful version with wicked step-mothers, feisty princesses and a campy Iachimo. The 2014 version, directed by Rachel Alt, went in a completely opposite direction and placed the action on ranch in the American Old West. The Queen was a southern belle married to a rancher, with Imogen as a high society girl in love with the cowhand Posthumous.

In a 2007 Cheek by Jowl production, Tom Hiddleston doubled as Posthumus and Cloten.

In 2011, the Shakespeare Theatre Company of Washington, DC, presented a version of the play that emphasised its fable and folklore elements, set as a tale within a tale, as told to a child.

In 2012, Antoni Cimolino directed a production at the Stratford Festival that steered into the fairy-tale elements of the text.

Also in 2012 the South Sudan Theatre Company staged Cymbeline in Juba Arabic for the Shakespeare's Globe "Globe to Globe" festival. It was translated by Derik Uya Alfred and directed by Joseph Abuk. Connections between the content of the play and South Sudan's own political struggle have been drawn by the production's producers, as well as some scholars. Overall, the production was well received by audiences and critics. Critic Matt Truman gave the production four out of five stars, saying "The world's youngest nation seems delighted to be here and, played with this much heart, even Shakespeare's most rambling romance becomes irresistible."

In 2013, Samir Bhamra directed the play for Phizzical Productions with six actors playing multiple parts for a UK national tour. The cast included Sophie Khan Levy as Innojaan, Adam Youssefbeygi, Tony Hasnath, Liz Jadav and Robby Khela. The production was set in the souks of Dubai and the Bollywood film industry during the 1990s communal riots and received acclaim from reviewers and academics alike.

Also in 2013, a folk musical adaptation of Cymbeline was performed at the First Folio Theatre in Oak Brook, Illinois. The setting was the American South during the Civil War, with Cymbeline as a man of high status who avoids military service. The play was performed outdoors and was accompanied by traditional Appalachian folk songs.

In 2015, at Shakespeare's Globe in the Sam Wanamaker Playhouse, a production was directed by Sam Yates where the role of Innogen was played by Emily Barber and Jonjo O'Neill as Posthumus. 

In 2016, Melly Still directed Cymbeline at the Royal Shakespeare Company. This version of the play was performed at the Royal Shakespeare Theatre before moving to the Barbican in late 2016. The performance featured Bethan Cullinane as Innogen and Gillian Bevan as Cymbeline.

Adaptations 

The play was adapted by Thomas d'Urfey as The Injured Princess, or, the Fatal Wager; this version was produced at the Theatre Royal, Drury Lane, presumably by the united King's Company and Duke's Company, in 1682. The play changes some names and details, and adds a subplot, typical of the Restoration, in which a virtuous waiting-woman escapes the traps laid by Cloten. D'Urfey also changes Pisanio's character so that he at once believes in Imogen's (Eugenia, in D'Urfey's play) guilt. For his part, D'Urfey's Posthumus is ready to accept that his wife might have been untrue, as she is young and beautiful. Some details of this alteration survived in productions at least until the middle of the century.

William Hawkins revised the play again in 1759. His was among the last of the heavy revisions designed to bring the play in line with classical unities. He cut the Queen, reduced the action to two places (the court and a forest in Wales). The dirge "With fairest flowers..." was set to music by Thomas Arne.

Nearer the end of the century, Henry Brooke wrote an adaptation which was apparently never staged. His version eliminates the brothers altogether as part of a notable enhancement of Posthumus's role in the play.

George Bernard Shaw, who criticised the play perhaps more harshly than he did any of Shakespeare's other works, took aim at what he saw as the defects of the final act in his 1937 Cymbeline Refinished; as early as 1896, he had complained about the absurdities of the play to Ellen Terry, then preparing to act Imogen. He called it "stagey trash of the lowest melodramatic order". He later changed his view, saying it was "one of the finest of Shakespeare's later plays", but he remained convinced that it "goes to pieces in the final act". Accordingly, in Cymbeline Refinished he rewrote the last act, cutting many of the numerous revelations and expositions, while also making Imogen a much more assertive figure in line with his feminist views.

There have been a number of radio adaptations of Cymbeline between the 1930s and the 2000s. The BBC broadcast productions of Cymbeline in the United Kingdom in 1934, 1951, 1957, 1986, 1996, and 2006. NBC broadcast a production of the play in the United States in 1938. In October 1951 the BBC aired a production of George Bernard Shaw's Cymbeline Refinished, as well as Shaw's foreword to the play.

Screen adaptations 
Lucius J. Henderson directed the first screen adaptation of Cymbeline in 1913. The film was produced by the Thanhouser Company and starred Florence La Badie as Imogen, James Cruze as Posthumus, William Garwood as Iachimo, William Russell as Cymbeline, and Jean Darnell as the Queen.

In 1937 the BBC broadcast several scenes of André van Gyseghem's production of the play, which opened 16 November the same year, on television. The scenes that comprised the broadcast were pulled exclusively from Acts I and II of the play, and included the 'trunk scene' from Act II Scene 2.  In 1956 the BBC produced a similar television program, this time airing scenes from Michael Benthall's theatrical production, which opened 11 September 1956. Like the 1937 program, the 1956 broadcast ran for roughly half an hour and presented several scenes from Cymbeline, including the trunk scene.

In 1968 Jerzy Jarocki directed an adaptation of the play for Polish television, starring Wiktor Sadecki as Cymbeline and Ewa Lassek as Imogen.

Elijah Moshinsky directed the BBC Television Shakespeare adaptation in 1982, ignoring the ancient British period setting in favour of a more timeless and snow-laden atmosphere inspired by Rembrandt and his contemporary Dutch painters. Richard Johnson, Claire Bloom, Helen Mirren, and Robert Lindsay play Cymbeline, his Queen, Imogen, and Iachimo, respectively, with Michael Pennington as Posthumus.

In 2014, Ethan Hawke and director Michael Almereyda, who previously collaborated on the 2000 film Hamlet, re-teamed for the film Cymbeline, in which Hawke plays Iachimo. The film is set in the context of urban gang warfare. Ed Harris takes the title role. Penn Badgley plays the orphan Posthumus; Milla Jovovich plays the role of the Queen; Anton Yelchin is Cloten; and Dakota Johnson plays the role of Imogen.

Stage adaptions

Prior to operatic adaptations only incidental music was composed. The first operatic adaption seems to be composed by Edmond Missa in 1894, under the title "Dinah"; American composer Christopher Berg composed another one, of which scenes were performed in 2009.

Cultural references 
In Beethoven’s one opera Fidelio, the loyal wife Leonore, disguising herself as a man, takes on the name Fidelio, as a probable reference to Imogen’s cross-dressing as Fidele.

The 'Song' from Act II, Scene 3 (Hark, hark! the lark) was set to music by Franz Schubert in 1826.

Perhaps the most famous verses in the play come from the funeral song of Act IV, Scene 2, which begins:
Fear no more the heat o' the sun,
Nor the furious winter's rages;
Thou thy worldly task hast done,
Home art gone, and ta'en thy wages:
Golden lads and girls all must,
As chimney-sweepers, come to dust.

The first two lines are quoted by Virginia Woolf in Mrs. Dalloway by the two main characters Clarissa and Septimus Smith. The lines, which turn Mrs. Dalloway's thoughts to the trauma of the First World War, are at once an elegiac dirge and a profoundly dignified declaration of endurance. The song provides a major organisational motif for the novel. The final couplet also appears in the Anton Myrer novel, The Last Convertible.

The last two lines appear to have inspired T. S. Eliot in "Lines to a Yorkshire Terrier" (in Five-Finger Exercises).  He writes:

Pollicle dogs and cats all must
Jellicle cats and dogs all must
Like undertakers, come to dust.

The song was set to music by Roger Quilter as "Fear No More the Heat o' the Sun," No. 1 of Five Shakespeare Songs, Op. 23 (1921). It was also set by Gerald Finzi as part of his song cycle on texts by Shakespeare Let Us Garlands Bring (1942). The text is sung by Cleo Laine to music by John Dankworth on her 1964 album Shakespeare and All That Jazz.

At the end of Stephen Sondheim's The Frogs, William Shakespeare is competing against George Bernard Shaw for the title of best playwright, deciding which of them is to be brought back from the dead in order to improve the world. Shakespeare sings the funeral song of Act IV, Scene 2, when asked about his view of death (the song is titled "Fear No More").

"Fear no more the heat of the sun" is the line that Winnie and her husband are trying to remember in Samuel Beckett's Happy Days as they sit exposed to the elements.

In the Epilogue of the novel Appointment with Death by Agatha Christie, the first four lines of the verse are quoted by the character Ginevra Boynton as she reflects on the life of her deceased mother Mrs Boynton.

In The Scent of Water (1963) by Elizabeth Goudge, the central character, Mary Lindsay, feels struck by lightning when she realises she has fallen in love with Paul Randall, an author and Royal Air Force pilot, blinded in the last days of World War II, and married. "Fear no more the lightning-flash", Mary suddenly thinks, along with the rest of that stanza, ending "All lovers young, all lovers must /Consign to thee, and come to dust", knowing she must hide her love, and recognising that, already fifty, she is growing old (Chapter IX, Part 1, p 164).

See also 
 Cymbeline, 2014 film

Notes and references

Notes

References

Bibliography

Editions of Cymbeline

Secondary sources

Further reading
 Pino-Saavedra, Yolando, Kurt Ranke, Italo Calvino, J. M. Synge, Violet Paget, Alan Bruford, Peter Christian Asbjørnsen, and Jørgen Moe. "Cymbeline." In Shakespeare and the Folktale: An Anthology of Stories, edited by ARTESE CHARLOTTE, 241-99. PRINCETON; OXFORD: Princeton University Press, 2019. doi:10.2307/j.ctvg25434.11.

External links 
 
 Cymbeline – Texts, supplementary materials, and resources at Internet Shakespeare Editions.
 Cymbeline – from Project Gutenberg
 

English Renaissance plays
Shakespearean comedies
Fiction set in Roman Britain
British traditional history
1611 plays
British plays adapted into films
Uxoricide in fiction
Plays set in the 1st century
Tragicomedy plays